The Resonance method of ice destruction means breaking sheet-ice which has formed over a body of water by causing the ice and water to oscillate up and down until the ice suffers sufficient mechanical fatigue to cause a fracture.

Resonance
If static force is applied to a sheet of ice it will flex slightly before suffering a catastrophic failure. Since the ice will bend slightly when any capable vehicle travels on ice-covered water, it follows that travelling at some critical speed may impose sufficient flexing of the ice sheet to cause resonance, and this may result in positive feedback effectively amplifying the oscillation within the body of water supporting the ice beneath the vehicle.

Flexural gravity waves
Flexural gravity waves (FGW) are three-dimensional oscillations of forces which occur within a disturbed liquid and are usually observed as surface waves.
 
There have been cases of destruction of ice by flexural gravity waves produced by moving cars, trains on railway crossings, aircraft during takeoff and landing, etc. However, at present the most appropriate vehicles for implementation of the method are amphibious hovercraft, also known as air cushion vehicles (ACV).

The primary means to break the ice cover is the icebreaker fleet. However, large energy consumption for the destruction of the ice, the inability to perform icebreaking operations in shallow waters because of the deep draught of icebreakers, and other difficulties have prompted a search for fundamentally new ways of destruction of ice. One of them is designed by Viktor Kozin author of the study: "Resonance method of destruction of ice cover".

Overview of technique
The motion of a load over ice cover develops a system of flexural gravity waves. This is a combination of flexural vibrations of the ice plate and associated gravitational waves in the water. When the velocity of the load is close to the minimum phase velocity of the FGW, the water ceases to support the ice sheet, and support is achieved only by the elastic properties of the ice. The amplitude of the FGW increases sharply and, with a sufficient load, destruction begins.  The power consumption is several times lower (depending on the thickness of the ice) compared with icebreakers and ice-breaking attachments. This method of ice destruction is known as the resonance method.

Advantages
The advantages of hovercraft are the lack of exposure of the vehicle body to the ice and the ability to cross safely over snow and ice cover, broken ice and open water. The virtual absence of draught in hovercraft can break the ice in pools of any depth.

Using a hovercraft for destruction of ice is desirable because this type of vehicle makes possible a combination of transport and ice-breaking, and its all-terrain qualities facilitate year-round operation.

The high speed of destruction of ice by hovercraft can effectively make an early opening of individual sections of rivers and reservoirs. This may not only increase the period of navigation, but also prevent the phenomenon of mash. Working an ACV in the resonant regime is effective not only on surface ice but also on deep ice, and this can prevent disasters occurring during freeze-up and drifting.

Research
Scientist Viktor Kozin has obtained experimental theoretical curves, which reveal all the possibilities of his method.

References

Literature 
 A.V. Palygina resonance method of ice cover destruction M.: Izd LLC School Press, 2009 48-50c. 
 Kornev, A.A., Krestyaninov V.F. Levschanov L.P. Ryabinkin A.B. Full-scale study of ice fracture resonance method amphibious hovercraft / Design Considerations vessels in ice. Intercollegiate Sat Scient. Proceedings .- 1988 .- Gorkiy p. 107-117.
 Sea Technology: Providing Safe Submarine Surfacing From Under Ice Cover. Sea Technology, November, 2010, №11

Patents 
 Method of ice cover destruction, RF Patent No. 1605471 from 19.11.1993 Kozin V.M.
 Method of destruction of ice hovercraftRussian Patent No. 1766012 from 01.06.1992 Kozin V.M.

Publications in refereed journals 
 Kozin V.M., Pogorelov, AV Wave resistance amphibious hovercraft when driving on ice. / Applied Mechanics and Technical Physics. - Novosibirsk: Publishing House SB RAS. - 2003. - T. 44. - No. 2. - S. 49-55
 Kozin V.M., Pogorelova A.V. Mathematical Modeling of Shocr Loading of Solid Ice Cover / / The Sixth (2004) ISOPE Pacific / Asia Offshore Mechanics Syptember 12–16, 2004, Vladivostok Russia
 Kozin V.M., Pogorelova A.V. Mathematical Modeliing of Shock Loading of a Solid Ice Cover / / International Journal of Offshore and Polar Engineeriing (ISSN 1053-5381) Copyright © by International Society of Offshore and Polar Engineers. Vol., 1916, No. 1, march, 2005, pp. 1–4
 Kozin V.M., Pogorelova A.V. Nonstationary Motion of Amphibian Air-Cushion Vehicll on Ice Fields / / The Seventh (2006) ISOPE Pacific / Asia Offshore Mechanics Simposium. Dalian, China, September 17–21, 2006

Articles in scientific books and periodical publications 
 Kozin V.M., Pogorelova A.V. Viscoelastic response of floating ice plate to a stationary moving SVPA. In Sat "Far Eastern. Mathematical School-Seminar. Acad. E.V. Zolotov. - Vladivostok: Izd Dalnvost. Press, 2003. - P. 117
 V.M. Kozin, A.V. Onischuk Investigation of one of the problems surfacing submarine vessels in the ice cover. / / Modern technologies in shipbuilding education, science and industry., Nizhny Novgorod, Novosibirsk State Technical University, 2003

Publications in materials research activities 
 Kozin V.M., Pogorelova, A.V. New perspectives in the use of amphibious hovercraft. Proceedings of the International Forum on science, technology and education. T2/pod edited VPSavinykh, V.V.Vishnevskogo.-M.: Academy of Earth Sciences, 2004, p. 98-99
 Kozin V.M., Tereschenkova ES Analysis of the causes and the recommended methods of destruction of congestion. Problems of continuum mechanics and related problems of mechanical engineering: Sat. Reports of the Third Conference. Vladivostok, Komsomolsk-on-Amur, September, 2004. Komsomolsk-on-Amur: IMiM FEBRAS, 2005, p. 130-133
 Kozin V.M. Lomakin N.S. Problems outlined with hovercrafts. Problems of continuum mechanics and related problems of mechanical engineering: Sat. Reports of the Third Conference. Vladivostok, Komsomolsk-on-Amur, September, 2004. Komsomolsk-on-Amur: IMiM FEBRAS, 2005, p. 134-137
 Kozin V.M., Koloshenko JB Experimental studies of deformation of the ice cover caused by moving loads. Problems of continuum mechanics and related problems of mechanical engineering: Sat. Reports of the Third Conference. Vladivostok, Komsomolsk-on-Amur, September, 2004. Komsomolsk-on-Amur: IMiM FEBRAS, 2005, p. 138-142

External links 
 http://www.griffonhoverwork.com/news/latest-news/ice-breaking-hovercraft.aspx Griffon8000 TD hovercraft used for ice-breaking in Canada.

Water ice
Icebreakers
Hovercraft
Russian inventions